Sudhan (also known as Sudhozai Pathan)  is one of the major tribes from the districts of Poonch, Sudhanoti, Bagh and Kotli in Azad Kashmir, allegedly originating from Pashtun areas.

History and particulars

The tribe claims an Afghan ancestry. According to Syed Ali, Sudhans have a Pashtun descent and moved to the Poonch district of Kashmir region some centuries ago. Sudhans from Poonch considered themselves to be Sudhozai Pathans (Pashtuns). Scholar Iffat Malik of the Institute of Strategic Studies Islamabad writes:

About 40,000–60,000 Sudhans were recruited and served in the British Indian Army during the First and Second World Wars. The Sadozai are a lineage of the Popalzai clan of the Abdali tribe of the ethnic Pashtun. The lineage takes its name from its ancestor, Sado Khan.

Role in 1947 Poonch rebellion

The Sudhan tribe has been described as "a main and martial tribe of dissident Poonch" by Christopher Snedden, a political analyst. Sardar Ibrahim Khan, a barrister, and politician of the Muslim Conference party, was among the Sudhan people who rose to significance in 1947 as a result of the campaign and later rebellion against the Maharaja of the princely state of Jammu and Kashmir. Khan led a significant faction of the Muslim Conference activists in their demands that Singh should join Pakistan rather than accede to India. Together with the Dhunds from Bagh, it was the Sudhans who were at the heart of this campaign. The rebels were directed by the Pakistan Army, and with the support of Pashtun tribal lashkars sent in from the Khyber and Waziristan tribal agencies, they were able to 'liberate' a portion of the state, called Azad Kashmir (Free Kashmir). Azad Kashmir has been under the control Pakistan ever since.

1955 Poonch Uprising

Sudhans played an immense role in the 1955 Poonch rebellion, who revolted against the appointment of Sher Ahmed Khan and dismissal of Sardar Ibrahim Khan. The violent anti government protestors demanded regional autonomy, especially in the administration and for budgets.

1837 Poonch Revolt

In 1837, after Hari Singh Nalwa's death in the Battle of Jamrud, the Sudhan tribe of Poonch, together with other tribes and Pahari speaking people, rose in revolt in Poonch. The insurgency was led by Shams Khan, a Chief of the Sudhan tribe  and former confidential follower of Dhian Singh. Thus the betrayal of Shams Khan Sudhan against the regime was taken personally and Gulab Singh was given the task of crushing the rebellion. After defeating the insurgents in Hazara and Murree hills, Gulab Singh stayed at Kahuta for some time and promoted disunion among the insurgents. Then his forces were sent to crush the insurgents. Eventually, Shams Khan Sudhan and his nephew were betrayed and their heads were cut off during their sleep while the lieutenants were captured, flayed alive and put to death with cruelty. The contemporary British commentators state that the local population suffered immensely, many of rebels were caputerd, and treated with a vengeance; their hands and feet were served by axes, while skins of Mali Khan and Sabz Ali Khan, two of the close accomplices of Shams were peeled off their bodies and their heads were hung on gallows in a crossing as a warning to others. Hands were ultimately laid on the chief rebel as well, and his head was cut off.

Politics
Together with the Dhunds & Rajputs.it is the Sudhans who dominate the politics of Azad Kashmir in the present day, although the Gujjar community is probably the largest among the population.

References

Further reading

Social groups of Azad Kashmir
Pashtun tribes